Smith's Irrigation Ditch, originally the Big Ditch and also known as the City Ditch, is a historic ditch primarily visible in Washington Park, Denver, Colorado.  It is listed on the National Register of Historic Places.

It was dug using horse-drawn plows and scrapers, in addition to manual labor.

It runs from the Chatfield Dam through  of Englewood, Colorado, with Englewood taking some of its municipal water supply from it. It sustains trees, flowers, grass there.

References

Geography of Denver
National Register of Historic Places in Denver
Irrigation in the United States
Irrigation canals
Historic districts on the National Register of Historic Places in Colorado
Water supply infrastructure on the National Register of Historic Places
Canals opened in 1865